The RCW Catalogue (from Rodgers, Campbell & Whiteoak) is an astronomical catalogue of Hα-emission regions in the southern Milky Way, described in . It contains 182 objects, including many of the earlier Gum catalogue (84 items) objects.

The later Caldwell catalogue included some objects from the RCW catalogue. There is also some overlap with the Sharpless catalogue-2 (312 items), although that primarily covered the northern hemisphere, whereas RCW and Gum primarily covered the southern hemisphere.

The RCW catalogue was compiled by Alexander William Rodgers, Colin T. Campbell and John Bartlett Whiteoak. They catalogued southern nebulae while working under Bart Bok at the Mount Stromlo Observatory in Australia in the 1960s.

Examples

List

RCW 1
RCW 2
RCW 3
RCW 4
RCW 5
RCW 6
RCW 7
RCW 8
RCW 9
RCW 10
RCW 11
RCW 12
RCW 13
RCW 14
RCW 15
RCW 16
RCW 17
RCW 18
RCW 19
RCW 20
RCW 21
RCW 22
RCW 23
RCW 24
RCW 25
RCW 26
RCW 27
RCW 28
RCW 29
RCW 30
RCW 31
RCW 32
RCW 33
RCW 34
RCW 35
RCW 36
RCW 37
RCW 38
RCW 39
RCW 40
RCW 41
RCW 42
RCW 43
RCW 44
RCW 45
RCW 46
RCW 47
RCW 48
RCW 49
RCW 50
RCW 51
RCW 52
RCW 53
RCW 54
RCW 55
RCW 56
RCW 57
RCW 58
RCW 59
RCW 60
RCW 61
RCW 62
RCW 63
RCW 64
RCW 65
RCW 66
RCW 67
RCW 68
RCW 69
RCW 70
RCW 71
RCW 72
RCW 73
RCW 74
RCW 75
RCW 76
RCW 77
RCW 78
RCW 79
RCW 80
RCW 81
RCW 82
RCW 83
RCW 84
RCW 85
RCW 86
RCW 87
RCW 88
RCW 89
RCW 90
RCW 91
RCW 92
RCW 93
RCW 94
RCW 95
RCW 96
RCW 97
RCW 98
RCW 99
RCW 100
RCW 101
RCW 102
RCW 103
RCW 104
RCW 105
RCW 106
RCW 107
RCW 108
RCW 109
RCW 110
RCW 111
RCW 112
RCW 113
RCW 114
RCW 115
RCW 116
RCW 117
RCW 118
RCW 119
RCW 120
RCW 121
RCW 122
RCW 123
RCW 124
RCW 125
RCW 126
RCW 127
RCW 128
RCW 129
RCW 130
RCW 131
RCW 132
RCW 133
RCW 134
RCW 135
RCW 136
RCW 137
RCW 138
RCW 139
RCW 140
RCW 141
RCW 142
RCW 143
RCW 144
RCW 145
RCW 146
RCW 147
RCW 148
RCW 149
RCW 150
RCW 151
RCW 152
RCW 153
RCW 154
RCW 155
RCW 156
RCW 157
RCW 158
RCW 159
RCW 160
RCW 161
RCW 162
RCW 163
RCW 164
RCW 165
RCW 166
RCW 167
RCW 168
RCW 169
RCW 170
RCW 171
RCW 172
RCW 173
RCW 174
RCW 175
RCW 176
RCW 177
RCW 178
RCW 179
RCW 180
RCW 181
RCW 182

See also
 Sharpless catalog
 Gum Catalog
 Caldwell catalogue
 List of Star-Forming Regions in the Local Group

References

External links
 The RCW Catalog (details and photographs of objects)
 Galactic Explorers: Gum, Bok and Sharpless (history)
 ESO, RCW 86 video

Astronomical catalogues of nebulae
H II regions
1960 documents
1960 in science